Zhao Xiaotian (Chinese:赵啸天; Pinyin: Zhào Xiàotiān; born 1 October 1993) is a Chinese football player who currently plays for Dandong Tengyue in the China League Two.

Club career
Zhao started his professional football career in 2011 when he was loan to China League Two club Wenzhou Provenza from Hangzhou Greentown for one year. He was promoted to Hangzhou Greentown's first team squad by Takeshi Okada in the summer of 2012. On 22 March 2015, he made his senior debut for Hangzhou in a 1–1 away draw against Beijing Guoan, coming on as a substitute for Chen Zhongliu in the 77th minute.

On 26 February 2016, Zhao transferred to Chinese Super League newcomer Hebei China Fortune. Initially the club used all their transfer quota and Zhao was moved to the reserves. After three seasons with them he did not make any senior appearances for the club and on 1 March 2019, Zhao transferred to China League Two club Baoding Yingli Yitong.

Career statistics 
Statistics accurate as of match played 31 December 2020.

References

External links
ZHAO XIAOTIAN at Soccerway.com

Living people
1993 births
Sportspeople from Baoding
Association football forwards
Chinese footballers
Footballers from Hebei
Zhejiang Professional F.C. players
Hebei F.C. players
Baoding Yingli Yitong players
Chinese Super League players
China League Two players